Széntpéterszeg is a village in Hajdú-Bihar county, in the Northern Great Plain region of eastern Hungary.

Geography

Mayors

1990-2019 - Mihály Olajos

2019-Incumbent - Gábor Csaba Kiss

Populated places in Hajdú-Bihar County

Medics
2019-Incumbent Csepei Szimona